The Bobs was a wooden roller coaster located at Riverview Park in Chicago, Illinois. It was built in 1924 and was demolished with the rest of the park in 1967. The Bobs was built by Prior and Church and designed by Fred Church.

A modernized version called Raging Wolf Bobs was located at the now defunct Geauga Lake in Aurora, Ohio, though it was not considered as intense as the original. A rollback accident that occurred on the ride resulted in a season-long closure. The Bobs was immortalized in American humorist Jean Shepherd's broadcast on August 26, 1967.

References

External links
 Photograph of the first drop

Former roller coasters in Illinois
Tourist attractions in Chicago